The Free State of Prussia held elections to its Landtag between 1919 and 1933. From 1919 through 1928, these elections gave a plurality to the SPD. In 1932 and 1933, the NSDAP (Nazi Party) won pluralities, generally in line with the rest of Germany. The Landtag subsequently was formally abolished as a result of the "Law on the Reconstruction of the Reich" of 30 January 1934 which replaced the German federal system with a unitary state.

References 

Elections in the Weimar Republic
1920s in Prussia
1930s in Prussia
Politics of Prussia
Prussia 
Prussia
Prussia 
Prussia 
Prussia
Prussia